MV Breconshire was a  cargo liner built in the late 1930s for the Glen Line. She was taken over by the Royal Navy during World War II as a supply ship and modified to carry fuel oil. The ship participated in many Malta convoys and was sunk by Axis bombers on 27 March 1942. 

This ship was a former Holt liner converted  to serve as a fast tanker.  She was forced to beach due to damage sustained during a convoy run from Alexandria to Malta.  Though the ship was put out of action, she was stranded high enough out of the water that some of her vital cargo of petroleum was salvaged.

References

External links

 Lloyd's Register of Ships, 1940
  London Gazette, Sept 1940

Glen Line
1939 ships
Maritime incidents in March 1942
Ministry of War Transport ships
Merchant ships sunk by aircraft
Ships built by the Taikoo Dockyard and Engineering Company